Woldingham School is an independent boarding and day school for girls, located in the former Marden Park of  outside the village of Woldingham, Surrey, in South East England.

It is a Roman Catholic school and a member of the global Network of Sacred Heart Schools.

History 
The school was founded as the Convent of the Sacred Heart in 1842 in Berrymead, London by the Society of the Sacred Heart; the first Convent of the Sacred Heart in England. The Society had been founded in France in 1800 by Madeleine Sophie Barat (canonized in 1925) immediately after the French Revolution (1789–1799). The first Sacred Heart school had opened in 1801 at Amiens, France; others were soon established in France and across Europe.

The Convent of the Sacred Heart moved to Roehampton, London, in 1850. Shortly after the 1939 outbreak of World War II, the school was evacuated, first to Newquay and later to Stanford Hall, near Rugby. Because the house at the Roehampton site was badly damaged during a 1941 air raid and later had to be demolished, the school decided, at the end of war, to find a new location. Marden Park was purchased by the Society in 1945, and the school moved in one year later. Early in the 1980s, the Society decided to commit the school to lay management under the trusteeship of the Society. In 1984, Philomena Dineen was appointed first lay Head of School for the newly renamed Woldingham School; she took up her duties in January 1985.

Accommodation structure
Girls in different year-groups live in different boarding houses: Marden House (Years 7 and 8, i.e. 11- to 13-year-olds), Main House (Years 9, 10 and 11, i.e. 13- to 16-year-olds). Sixth Form girls are accommodated in Berwick House and Shanley House, named respectively after Dr Edward Berwick, Chairman of Governors (1989–1995) and Sister Claire Shanley, Mistress General (1947–1968).

House system
On entering the school, girls are placed into one of four house tutor groups named after four nuns who were influential figures in the development of the Society. They are Saint Madeleine Sophie Barat, who founded the Society; Saint Rose Philippine Duchesne; Mother Janet Stuart; and Mother Mabel Digby.

Woldingham educates girls between age 11 to 18 who can join the school at ages 11, 12, 13 or 16, i.e. at any stage in the junior school (Marden House) or upon entering senior school (Main House). Girls can also join after completing the General Certificate of Secondary Education and enter straight into the Sixth Form.

School fee fixing scandal
The school was involved in the Independent school fee fixing scandal in the mid-2000s. On 20 November 2006, the Office of Fair Trading (OFT) announced its decision following a 2005–2006 investigation  into allegations that fifty of England's top independent schools, including Woldingham, had broken competition law (section 2[1] of the Competition Act 1998) by sharing information about fees via the so-called "Sevenoaks Survey". The OFT made no finding as to whether there was an effect on the fee levels of the schools concerned. The schools agreed to pay nominal penalties of £10,000 each, a reduced penalty in view of a number of exceptional features in the case: a voluntary admission had been made, the bodies were all non-profit making charities and they had set up a £3 million educational trust fund for those who had attended the schools in the relevant period.

This situation came about as a result of a dispute between the U.K. Charity Commission for England and Wales, which regulates the behaviour of U.K. charitable organizations, and the Office of Fair Trading, responsible for profit-making businesses. Although U.K. charities are required to publish financial and other information, U.K. businesses are not allowed to collaborate to set prices. The U.K.Competition Act 1998, which regulates the behaviour of businesses, was altered in 2000 to place independent schools – which are charities – in the same category as businesses as far as exchange of financial information is concerned.

Notable former pupils

Convent of the Sacred Heart, Roehampton

All of those listed attended the school for at least one term and the names used are those by which they are best known: 

 Evelyn Anthony, writer
 Candy Atherton, politician
 Sonia Brownell, editor and wife of George Orwell  
 Dame Mary Douglas, social anthropologist
 Tessa Fraser who became Lady Keswick
 Vivien Leigh (1920), actress
 Maureen O'Sullivan, actress
 Valerie Hunter Gordon, inventor of the disposable nappy
 Princess Elisabeth, Duchess of Hohenberg (Luxembourg)
 Princess Irmingard of Bavaria (1936)
 Princess Maria Adelgunde of Hohenzollern
 Princess Marie-Adélaïde of Luxembourg
 Princess Theodora of Greece and Denmark
 Antonia White, writer

Woldingham School

 Moet Abebe, Nigerian VJ
 Suzanne Bertish (1969), actress
 Marsha Fitzalan, actress
 Clarissa Dickson Wright (expelled), celebrity chef and former barrister
 Caroline Waldegrave, cookery writer and president of the Hospital Caterers Association
 Caroline Wyatt (1984), BBC news journalist
 Louise Mensch (1989), Conservative MP for Corby (2010–2012), novelist (as Louise Bagshawe)
 Tilly Bagshawe, journalist and writer
 Artemis Cooper, writer
 Sofia Ellar, singer-songwriter
 Leslie Ferrar, treasurer to Charles, Prince of Wales
 Dillie Keane (expelled), actress, singer and comedian
 Tanya Hamilton (née Nation), Marchioness of Hamilton
 Lucy Ferry (née) Helmore, socialite
 Carey Mulligan (2003), Academy Award-nominated actress
 Lady Isabella Hervey (2000), socialite, model and actress
 Florence Brudenell-Bruce (2003), lingerie model and socialite

Helen Whately, Conservative MP for Faversham and Mid Kent
Emma Corrin (2014), actress known for playing Diana, Princess of Wales in The Crown

See also
List of Schools of the Sacred Heart

References

External links
 Profile at the independent schools Council website
 Profile at the Girls' Schools Association website

Boarding schools in Surrey
Girls' schools in Surrey
Roman Catholic private schools in the Diocese of Arundel and Brighton
Private schools in Surrey
Educational institutions established in 1842
1842 establishments in England
Catholic boarding schools in England
Member schools of the Girls' Schools Association
Sacred Heart schools